This is the discography for German electronic music ensemble Snap!

Albums

Studio albums

Compilation albums

Singles

References 

Discographies of German artists
Electronic music discographies